Baiyashi is a town of Dong'an County, Hunan province, China, it is the county seat of the county. the present town was reformed by merging the former Baiyashi Town and Dajiangkou Township on November 11, 2015. The town is divided into 39 villages, its administrative centre is Linjiao Village.

References 

Dong'an County
County seats in Hunan